The Men Who Loved Music is the third album by rock band Young Fresh Fellows.  Their first for Frontier Records, it was released in 1987. The seventh track, "Amy Grant," was a college radio hit.

Tracks 1-14 are from the original release of "The Men Who Loved Music" (spine title: "Chicago 19").  Tracks 16-21 on the CD reissue are from the EP "Refreshments" (spine title: "Condiments").  Track 15 ("Happy Death Theme") was cut from the original album release for space reasons, and is available only on the combined CD. The reissue CD does not contain the "Young Fresh Fellows Theme" (remix), which was on the original vinyl release of "Refreshments."

Track 22 is listed in some music databases as "Do the Fonzie."  The face of the CD is illustrated with a picture of the character Fonzie, from the TV show Happy Days.

Track listing 
All songs written by Scott McCaughey. 
 Just Sit
 TV Dream
 Get Outta My Cave
 Why I Oughta
 Unimaginable Zero Summer
 When The Girls Get Here 	
 Amy Grant 	
 Hank, Karen And Elvis 	
 My Friend Ringo 	
 Two Brothers 	
 I Got My Mojo Working (And I Thought You'd Like To Know) 	
 I Don't Let The Little Things Get Me Down 	
 Ant Farm 	
 Where The Hell Did They Go? 	
 Happy Death Theme 	
 Beer Money 	
 Aurora Bridge 	
 Broken Basket 	
 Three Sides To This Story 	
 Young Fresh Fellows Update Theme 	
 Back Room Of The Bar 	
 Untitled

References 

The Young Fresh Fellows albums
1987 albums
Albums produced by Conrad Uno
Frontier Records albums